I Love the '70s: Volume 2 is a television mini-series and the ninth installment of the I Love the... series presented by VH1. The sequel to I Love the '70s, it originally aired on VH1 from July 10 to July 14, 2006.

Commentators

Carlos Alazraqui
Tony Alva
Antigone Rising (Cassidy and Kristen Henderson)
Alison Arngrim
Bronson Arroyo
Shondrella Avery
Alonzo Bodden
Tim Bagley
Bella the Chimp
Michael Ian Black
Linda Blair
Chris Booker
Tom Bosley
Bryan Callen
Charo
Gary Cole
Michael Colton and John Aboud
Nadia Comaneci
Common
Bart Conner
Chris Coppola
Fred Coury
Jennifer Elise Cox
Molly Culver
Stephanie D'Abruzzo
Laura Dean
Dom DeLuise
Nick DiPaolo
The Donnas (Allison Robertson and Maya Ford)
Simon Doonan
Bil Dwyer
Nicole Eggert
Rich Eisen
David James Elliott
Bob Eubanks
Bill Fagerbakke
Damien Fahey
Adam Ferrara
Greg Fitzsimmons
Tyler Florence
Neil Flynn
Jake Fogelnest
Ben Folds
Peter Frampton
Drew Fraser
Doug E. Fresh
Max Gail
Willie Garson
Gloria Gaynor
Jason George
Godfrey
Elon Gold
Genevieve Gorder
Gilbert Gottfried
Erin Gray
Annabelle Gurwitch
Luis Guzman
Alyson Hannigan
Har Mar Superstar
Hard 'n Phirm
Rachael Harris
Tony Hawk
John Heffron
Marilu Henner
Mark Hoppus
Clint Howard
Ken Howard
Engelbert Humperdinck
Scott Ian
Jennifer Irwin
Ron Jeremy
Chris Jericho
Jake Johannsen
Randy Jones
Kermit the Frog
Christopher Knight
Jo Koy
David Lander
Steve Landesberg
Joe Lorge
Loni Love
Stephen Lynch
Madame
Kathleen Madigan
Ross Mark
Biz Markie
Maroon 5 (Adam Levine and James Valentine)
Debbie Matenopoulos
Edwin McCain
Jay McCarroll
Melissa McCarthy
Darryl McDaniels
John Melendez
Daryl Mitchell
Billy Morrison
David Naughton
Nelson
Dustin Nguyen
Night Ranger (Jack Blades and Jeff Watson)
Graham Norton
Patrice O'Neal
Stuart Pankin
Tom Papa
Butch Patrick
Freda Payne
Stephen Perkins
Cassandra Peterson
Brian Posehn
Megyn Price
Rachel Quaintance
Riki Rachtman
Melissa Rivers
Mo Rocca
Darius Rucker
Dave "Snake" Sabo
William Sanderson
Fred Schneider
Donovan Scott
Stuart Scott
Willard Scott
Sherri Shepard
Brad Sherwood
Sir Mix-A-Lot
Hal Sparks
Rick Springfield
Joel Stein
French Stewart
Fisher Stevens
Jeff Stilson
Michael Strahan
Brenda Strong
Nicole Sullivan
Brian Unger
Gary Valentine
Frank Vincent
John Waters
Lauren Weedman
Kevin Weisman
Jill Whelan
Chandra Wilson
Chris Wylde
"Weird Al" Yankovic
Cedric Yarbrough
Zero Boy
Bob Zmuda
Rob Zombie

Recurring segments
 Bruce Lee and Evel Knievel in Stunt Fu: A cut-out of Bruce Lee and a cut-out of Evel Knievel on a motorcycle are edited into short video clips from the year in question. Bruce Lee generally kicks someone who falls over, and Evel Knievel jumps his motorcycle over someone in each video clip.
 Charo TV: Charo, who was a frequent television guest star in the 1970s, presents ideas of how she could have been introduced into the cast of a popular show from the time period. Each idea includes some reference to her "cuchi cuchi" catchphrase.
 Porn or Not Porn: John Waters features a segment in which he poses a small test to see whether or not three films, selected based on their suggestive titles, are either considered pornographic or not pornographic. He ends the segment by stating he found a vintage copy of a parodic pornographic film.
 It's Time for Burt Reynolds' Mustache: The segment shows a picture of Burt Reynolds from the relevant year, illustrating how his mustache changed over time (or 1972 was gone from his face), and is introduced by several voices annoyingly chanting the segment's title and is followed by the same voices chanting "That was Burt Reynolds' mustache."
 Songs to Make Whoopee To: Bob Eubanks presents the love songs from each year. Some of the song titles are fake, and merely read aloud; whenever he reads the title of an actual song, a clip of the song is played. The segment takes the form of an advertisement for an album, also available on 8-track and cassette.
 Then and Now: Alison Arngrim presents the segment for each year in which pop culture personalities from the decade are shown in pictures from the 1970s and today, a difference of thirty years which she emphasizes.
 Look Who's Got a Farrah Do: The segment takes a look at each year to see what celebrity had a hairdo similar to that of Charlie's Angels star Farrah Fawcett.
 Guitar Gods: Peter Frampton presents the guitar players of each year.
 Survivors: Gloria Gaynor presents the survivors of each year. Each segment begins by Gaynor citing three trends she survived that year.
 What Dom Cooked For...: The segment has actor Dom DeLuise telling viewers what food he would make for an actor, or some actors, and the name of the food would be based on a film, TV program, etc. from the episode's year.
 That's No Jive Turkey: The segment takes place near the end of an episode and would let a certain celebrity give one last opinion on a topic that was covered in the episode.
 Hey, I'm Not a Brady: Christopher Knight has a rant for each year over how he does not wish to be known as Peter Brady anymore. Each year features Knight drawing a contrast between a member of the show's cast and the character that actor portrayed.
 Guess This Joe: At the conclusion of each episode, there's a small puzzle being put together of a famous person named Joe, with the viewer's job being to "Guess this Joe" before the puzzle is finished and the identity is revealed. Some segments involve a celebrity with a related name, such as "Joey," "José" or "Joseph." The lyrics to the "Guess this Joe" song are: "Guess this Joe, it's a Joe you know, if you don't know this Joe, then it's a Joe you don't know, so if you guess this Joe, it's a Joe you know, guess this Joe, hey, guess this Joe..."
During the credits of every episode, a performance of a popular song from that decade was played with no commentary. These were usually replaced with a show promo by VH1.

Topics covered by year

1970
 Hawaii Five-O (originally premiered in 1968)
 AMC Gremlin
 "Spirit in the Sky" by Norman Greenbaum (originally released in the UK in 1969)
 Willis Reed and the 1970 NBA Finals
 Adam-12
 Miniskirts
 "Band of Gold" by Freda Payne
 Patton
 Airport
 Three Dog Night
 First floppy disk (previously mentioned in an I Love the '70s segment)
 Jimi Hendrix's music and death
 Woodstock Casey Kasem's American Top 40 Sly and the Family Stone
 Hippie fashions
 Beneath the Planet of the ApesCharo TV 1970: Charo's HeroesPorn or Not Porn 1970: Sex and the Single Vampire (porn), Two Mules for Sister Sara (not porn) and A Man Called Horse (not porn)

Then and Now 1970: Michael Nesmith, Michael Jackson and Mike Lookinland

Guitar Gods of 1970: Duane Allman, Terry Kath and Jimi Hendrix

Survivors of 1970: Ali MacGraw, Jane Fonda and Alice Nelson

What Dom Cooked for Hawkeye and Trapper John: Garlic M*A*S*H Potatoes

That's No Jive, Turkey: Rachael Harris on AMC Gremlin

Hey, I'm Not a Brady: Christopher Knight (real) and Peter Brady (fake)

Guess This Joe: Joe Torre

1971
 Hollywood Squares (originally premiered in 1966)
 The French Connection Carole King's Tapestry album
 The Rolling Stones' Sticky Fingers album
 Billy Jack Sears Toughskins
 View-Master
 The Dick Cavett Show (originally premiered in 1968)
 Grateful Dead
 K-Tel
 Malibu Barbie
 The Flip Wilson Show Jethro Tull
 Supercomb
 "If You Could Read My Mind"  by Gordon Lightfoot
 Brian's SongCharo TV 1971: Charo in the FamilyPorn or Not Porn 1971: Shaft (not porn), Bedknobs and Broomsticks (not porn) and Below the Belt (porn)

Then and Now 1971: Cybill Shepherd, Cat Stevens and Sean Connery

Guitar Gods of 1971: Pete Townshend, Jerry Garcia and Jimmy Page

Survivors of 1971: Rhoda Morgenstern, Sally Struthers and Cher

What Dom Cooked for Alex the Droog: A Clockwork Orange Julius

That's No Jive, Turkey: Modern Humorist on Grateful Dead

Hey, I'm Not a Brady: Barry Williams (real) and Greg Brady (fake)

Guess This Joe: Joe Jackson

1972
 Superfly The Paul Lynde Show Carly Simon and James Taylor
 1972 Nixon visit to China/Ling-Ling and Hsing-Hsing
 Pink Flamingos Alice Cooper
 Maude Nerf footballs 
 Miami Dolphins' perfect season
 Goodyear blimp
 Billy Dee Williams
 Gary Glitter
 The Bob Newhart Show Richard Pryor
 Bobby Fischer
 Man of La ManchaCharo TV 1972: Charo Five-OPorn or Not Porn 1972: Black Mama White Mama (not porn), Flesh of the Lotus (porn) and The Hot Rock (not porn)

Then and Now 1972: Sally Struthers & Rob Reiner, Burt Reynolds and David Cassidy

Guitar Gods of 1972: Neil Young, Steve Howe and Mick Ronson

Survivors of 1972: Bette Midler, Shirley Chisholm and Carly Simon

What Dom Cooked for Liza: Liza Minnelli Linguine with a Glass of Cabaret

That's No Jive, Turkey: Tom Papa on The Paul Lynde ShowHey, I'm Not a Brady: Mike Lookinland (real) and Bobby Brady (fake)

Guess This Joe: G.I. Joe

1973
 Match Game (originally premiered in 1962)
 Jesus Christ Superstar Homosexuality no longer considered a mental disorder
 "Half-Breed" by Cher
 Westworld "The Night the Lights Went Out in Georgia" by Vicki Lawrence (originally released in 1972) 
 Charlie perfume
 Steve McQueen
 "Let's Get It On" by Marvin Gaye
 The Streets of San Francisco (originally premiered in 1972)
 Elvis' Aloha from Hawaii via Satellite concert Celebrity Bowling  (originally premiered in 1971)
 Secretariat
 "Smoke on the Water" by Deep Purple
 Paper Moon American GraffitiCharo TV 1973: The Charo Tyler Moore ShowPorn or Not Porn 1973: Bang the Drum Slowly (not porn), The Last of Sheila (not porn) and Ride a Cocked Horse (porn)

Then and Now 1973: Cheech Marin, Cher and Roger Daltrey

Guitar Gods of 1973: David Gilmour, Lynyrd Skynyrd's Allen Collins & Gary Rossington and Ritchie Blackmore

Survivors of 1973: Barbra Streisand, Tatum O'Neal and Jane Seymour

What Dom Cooked for Babs and Robert: The Way We Waffles

That's No Jive, Turkey: Patrice O'Neal on Love Music

Hey, I'm Not a Brady: Robert Reed (real) and Mike Brady (fake)

Guess This Joe: Joe Paterno

1974
 The Mary Tyler Moore Show 
 The Street Fighter Electric Light Orchestra
 String bikini
 Password (originally premiered in 1961)
 Hank Aaron
 Mikhail Baryshnikov's defection to Canada
 Chico and the Man Harlem Globetrotters
 Burt Reynolds
 "Can't Get Enough of Your Love, Babe" by Barry White
 Bedazzler
 Alice Doesn't Live Here Anymore "Midnight Train to Georgia" by Gladys Knight & the Pips (originally released in 1973)
 Sit n' Spin 
 Heimlich maneuver
 EarthquakeCharo TV 1974: Little Charo on the PrairiePorn or Not Porn 1974: Blazing Zippers (porn), The Golden Voyage of Sinbad (not porn) and Fulfillment (porn)

Then and Now 1974: James Taylor, Melissa Gilbert and Bob Barker

Guitar Gods of 1974: Alex Lifeson, Mick Ralphs and Eric Clapton

Survivors of 1974: Diane Keaton, Half-Pint and Florida Evans

What Dom Cooked for Michael and Fredo: Fettuccini Al-Fredo Corleone

That's No Jive, Turkey: Greg Fitzsimmons on String bikini

Hey, I'm Not a Brady: Susan Olsen (real) and Cindy Brady (fake)

Guess This Joe: Joe DiMaggio

1975
 S.W.A.T. Dog Day Afternoon Skateboard craze
 "The Hustle" by Van McCoy and the dance craze
 The Rocky Horror Picture Show "Lady Marmalade" by LaBelle (originally released in 1974)
 1975 World Series
 RollerballDisappearance of Jimmy Hoffa
 "Thunder Road" by Bruce Springsteen
 AMC Pacer
 Joe Namath appears in a Beautymist pantyhose commercial
 Shampoo Nair
 The Swiss Family Robinson "You Are So Beautiful" by Joe Cocker (originally released in 1974) 
 The Return of the Pink PantherCharo TV 1975: The Charo Family RobinsonPorn or Not Porn 1975: Let's Do It Again (not porn), The Shootist (not porn) and The Analist (porn)

Then and Now 1975: Aretha Franklin, Mackenzie Phillips and Ron Palillo

Guitar Gods of 1975: Billy Gibbons, Joe Perry and Jeff Beck

Survivors of 1975: Martina Navratilova, Loretta Lynn and Julie Kotter

What Dom Cooked for Tommy: Keith Moon Pies

That's No Jive, Turkey: Luis Guzmán on S.W.A.T.Hey, I'm Not a Brady: Robbie Rist (real) and Cousin Oliver (fake)

Guess This Joe: José Feliciano

1976
 Network Fleetwood Mac
 "Afternoon Delight" by Starland Vocal Band
 In Search of... Laser shows
 The Doobie Brothers
 The Omen "Disco Duck" by Rick Dees
 Nadia Comăneci
 Thin Lizzy
 Paul McCartney and Wings
 Freaky Friday Captain and Tennille
 King KongCharo TV 1976: Welcome Back, CharoPorn or Not Porn 1976: The Pom Pom Girls (not porn), Mother, Jugs & Speed (not porn) and Kansas City Trucking Co. (porn)

Then and Now 1976: Jodie Foster, Peter Frampton and Farrah Fawcett

Guitar Gods of 1976: Ace Frehley, Keith Richards and Peter Frampton

Survivors of 1976: Jodie Foster, Farrah Fawcett and The Bionic Woman

What Dom Cooked for Deep Throat: All the President's Meatloaf

That's No Jive, Turkey: Sir Mix-a-Lot on Disco

Hey, I'm Not a Brady: Ann B. Davis (real) and Alice Nelson (fake)

Guess This Joe: Joey Lawrence (represented by a picture of a sperm)

1977
 Pumping Iron Billy Beer
 Quincy, M.E. (originally premiered in 1976)
 Calgon
 The Kentucky Fried Movie The Joker's Wild (originally premiered in 1972)
 Leif Garrett
 Name That Tune (originally premiered in 1952)
 The Hardy Boys/Nancy Drew Mysteries Plato's Retreat
 Ted Nugent
 Oh, God! Slap Shot Meat Loaf
 Elvis dies
 The Deep and OrcaCharo TV 1977: Charo's AngelsPorn or Not Porn 1977: Fun with Dick and Jane (not porn), Oh, God! (not porn) and Heavy Machinery (porn)

Then and Now 1977: Leif Garrett, Lt. Theo Kojak and Charo

Guitar Gods of 1977: Mick Jones, Lindsey Buckingham and Ted Nugent

Survivors of 1977: Barbara Walters, Laverne DeFazio and Joyce DeWitt

What Dom Cooked for Mr. Goodbar: Grilled Tony Lo Portobello Mushrooms

That's No Jive, Turkey: Carlos Alazraqui on Billy Beer

Hey, I'm Not a Brady: Eve Plumb (real) and Jan Brady (fake)

Guess This Joe: Joey Ramone

1978
 Battlestar Galactica Andy Gibb
 Leon Spinks wins Heavyweight Title over Muhammad Ali
 Mr. Whipple
 Dawn of the Dead (Italian release)
 Ginsu
 Blondie
 Pogo
 Barney Miller (originally premiered in 1975)
 Cheryl Tiegs
 Billy Joel
 Kristy McNichol
 Ice Castles Doctor Who (originally premiered in 1963)
 Devo
 Merlin
 Heaven Can Wait Midnight ExpressCharo TV 1978: CHARO in CincinnatiPorn or Not Porn 1978: The Tender Trap (porn), Goin' South (not porn) and Sweet Folds of Flesh (porn)
 
Then and Now 1978: Loni Anderson, Robby Benson and Lee Majors

Guitar Gods of 1978: Joe Walsh, Mark Knopfler and Eddie Van Halen

Survivors of 1978: Mindy McConnell, Tina Turner and Marilu Henner

What Dom Cooked for the Bee Gees: Sausage and Pepper's Lonely Hearts Sub

That's No Jive, Turkey: Michael Ian Black on Charmin

Hey, I'm Not a Brady: Maureen McCormick (real) and Marcia Brady (fake)

Guess This Joe: Joe Perry

1979
 Rock 'n' Roll High School "The Devil Went Down to Georgia" by Charlie Daniels Band
 ESPN
 The Amityville Horror "Rock Lobster" by The B-52's (originally released 1978)
 Frank Zappa's Joe's Garage album
 Trapper John, M.D. Disco Demolition Night
 Tab
 The Rose McDonald's Happy Meals
 The White Shadow (original premiered in 1978)
 "Is She Really Going Out With Him?" by Joe Jackson
 HairCharo TV 1979: Mork & CharoPorn or Not Porn 1979: Hardcore (not porn), The Black Hole (not porn) and Dracula Sucks'' (porn)

Then and Now 1979: Nick Nolte, Steve Martin and Janet Jackson

Guitar Gods of 1979: Angus Young, Judas Priest's Glenn Tipton & K. K. Downing and Brian May

Survivors of 1979: Jerry Hall, Florence Johnston and Bo Derek

What Dom Cooked for the Dallas Bulls: The North Dallas Forty Ounce Porterhouse

That's No Jive, Turkey: Greg Fitzsimmons on Disco Demolition Night

Hey, I'm Not a Brady: Florence Henderson (real) and Carol Brady (fake)

Guess This Joe: Joe Cool

External links 
 

Nostalgia television shows
Nostalgia television in the United States
VH1 original programming
2000s American television miniseries
2006 American television series debuts
2006 American television series endings